Thomas Foy may refer to:
Thomas P. Foy (1951–2004), American politician
Tom Foy (1879–1917), English music hall performer
Tommy Foy (1910–1985), Irish football player